Raymond P. "Ray" Christensen (May 6, 1924 – February 5, 2017) was an American sportscaster who was the play-by-play announcer for the Minnesota Golden Gophers sports teams from 1951 until 2001, working for WCCO in Minneapolis starting in 1963.

Christensen was born in 1924 in Minneapolis. A 1949 graduate of the University of Minnesota, he also served with the United States Army in World War II. In 2002, he was inducted into the Minnesota Broadcasting Hall of Fame. Christensen also worked games for the Minnesota Twins, Minnesota Vikings, and Minneapolis Lakers. In addition to his sports coverage, Christensen hosted a daily music appreciation segment on WCCO-AM titled "Musing on Music." Christensen would play a brief excerpt of a classical music piece and then report on its history and other musicology. He died on February 5, 2017, at the age of 92 from an upper respiratory infection in Rosemount, Minnesota, where he lived.

References

External links 
 Interview with Ray Christensen about his book Golden Memories, reflections of the Minnesota Gophers, co-authored by Stew Thornley, NORTHERN LIGHTS Minnesota Author Interview TV Series #296 (1994)

1924 births
2017 deaths
United States Army personnel of World War II
American radio sports announcers
College basketball announcers in the United States
College football announcers
Major League Baseball broadcasters
Minneapolis Lakers announcers
Minnesota Golden Gophers football
Minnesota Golden Gophers men's basketball
Minnesota Twins announcers
Minnesota Vikings announcers
National Basketball Association broadcasters
National Football League announcers
University of Minnesota alumni
People from Rosemount, Minnesota
Military personnel from Minneapolis